Aldona Nenėnienė-Česaitytė (born Česaitytė, (October 13, 1949 – April 3, 1999) in Daugirdai village, Alytus district municipality) is a former Soviet/Lithuanian handball player who competed in the 1976 Summer Olympics and in the 1980 Summer Olympics.

She trained at VSS Žalgiris in Kaunas and became the Honoured Master of Sports of the USSR in 1976. At the 1976 Summer Olympics she won the gold medal with the Soviet team. She played one match and scored two goals.

Four years later she was part of the Soviet team which won the gold medal again. She played one match.

References

External links
profile

1949 births
1999 deaths
People from Alytus District Municipality
Honoured Masters of Sport of the USSR
Soviet female handball players
Lithuanian female handball players
Handball players at the 1976 Summer Olympics
Handball players at the 1980 Summer Olympics
Olympic handball players of the Soviet Union
Olympic gold medalists for the Soviet Union
Olympic medalists in handball
Medalists at the 1980 Summer Olympics
Medalists at the 1976 Summer Olympics